Southridge High School is a public high school located in the city of Kennewick, Washington, United States (in Benton County). The school is part of Kennewick School District.  Construction of the $30 million building began in 1995, with classroom doors opening in the spring of 1997. The plans for Southridge High School were originally designed for a high school on the east side of the country; however, the school was never built and the Kennewick School District purchased the blueprints and plans. During construction, classes were held at Fruitland Elementary School, under the direction of Principal Ron Williamson. The first commencement was held inside the Toyota Center in June 1999. Southridge was the third 4A school constructed in Kennewick, but with the reorganization of leagues in 2006, Southridge became a 3A school and is now a member of the Columbia Basin League. Yet again, in 2008, it was decided that Southridge would be put back under the 4A schools along with 2 other high schools in Kennewick, WA.  Once again in 2010 Southridge was brought back down to a 3A school.

Facilities
The  campus lies within a valley on the southwest border of Kennewick. Southridge is located several miles away from the majority of its students.

The school's main complex, divided into wings A through G, was designed by the architecture firm Hammel, Green and Abrahamson of Minnesota; Joe Lavernier Construction of Spokane was the general contractor. The B, C and D-wings are classrooms, each containing two floors with eight classrooms per floor as well as lockers. The A-wing houses the auditorium, c music rooms and practice rooms. A-wing is located right next to the cafeteria. The F-wing contains one large gym and a small gym as well as a weight room, and two other rooms that are multipurpose - with locker rooms and training room both located downstairs. The E-wing contains the library and main offices downstairs and upstairs it holds more classrooms. G-wing holds all of the science classrooms, it is the only hall that has no rooms on the ground floor and was a new addition made in 2021.

The wings are all connected by a long crescent-shaped hall with A and F-wing at the north and south ends, respectively. The E-wing is in the inner curve, wings B, C and D branch off along the outer curve and all connect to G-wing upstairs.

The school grounds include football and baseball fields, an outdoor basketball court as well as softball fields, a track, several soccer fields, eight tennis courts, and 2  courtyards made at the time G-wing was added. The school uses the Kennewick Public Pool as it does not have one of its own.

Home of the Suns
The school nickname, the Suns, was selected in a vote among the first freshman class (Class of 1999). The mascot is a gorilla named "Sunny" and was inducted into SHS in the 2006-2007 school year.

The school colors are blue and gold (originally blue, silver and gold).  The school fight song, Southridge Will Forever Hold My Heart, was written in 1996 by a Southridge student to the tune of the Notre Dame Victory March.

Southridge has a storied Mock Trial Program. Winning back to back YMCA Mock Trial regional championships in 2012 and 2013, and attending the Washington State YMCA tournament multiple times.

The Southridge Drama department and Drama Club produce several ensemble performances each year.

Southridge also has one of the best engineering technology programs in the state, led formally by Jim  Hendricks, who was invited to join Tri-Cities STEM School, Delta High, in 2009. It offers college-level projects like power supplies and "Sumo" robots, with which it compete with Battelle. Its material science course offers the chance to create a sterling silver ring and a personal piece of stained glass, both designed by the students. The course was taught by Roy Bunnell.

Former Southridge student Danica Lyn Stewart achieved acting success in her adult life and can be seen on NBC's daytime soap Passions.

Athletics
Southridge participates in the Columbia Basin Big Nine (CBBN) 3A. The CBBN is the former Columbia Basin League which is the former Big Nine. Football and soccer games are played at Neil F. Lampson Stadium, which is located on the grounds of Kennewick High School. Southridge shares the stadium with Kennewick and Kamiakin High School. In their brief existence, the Suns have won state championships in dance for 4 years (2004–2008), golf, soccer, and baseball, along with several individual state championships in tennis, gymnastics, Swimming, diving, ice hockey, and wrestling.

Fight song
The Southridge High School fight song is sung to the tune of the Notre Dame Fight Song.

All hail to our Southridge High
Bring on the challenge, let's do or die
Honor, fame, and glory too
Guardians of the GOLD & BLUE!

We are the finest under the sun
Carry the fight 'till victory's won
Greatest school to you & I
That's almighty Southridge High

Notable alumni
Shawn O'Malley, infielder, Seattle Mariners

References

External links
SHS Homepage

High schools in Benton County, Washington
Schools in Kennewick, Washington
Public high schools in Washington (state)